RMS Amazon was an ocean liner build by Harland & Wolff for the Royal Mail Lines that could Transport 
488 passengers and cargo to and from South America. In 1968, the ship was sold to the Shaw, Savill & Albion Line and was renamed as Akaroa. In 1971 she was sold to a Norwegian company, Ugland, for conversion as a car carrier. but, In January 1982 she was scrapped at Kaohsiung, Taiwan.

References

Ships built by Harland and Wolff
Steamships of the United Kingdom
Merchant ships of the United Kingdom
Ships built in Belfast
1959 ships